Fakhreddin Jamali (born May 31, 1945) is an Iranian-Canadian professor of pharmacy and pharmaceutical sciences at the University of Alberta. He  is the founding president of the Canadian Society for Pharmaceutical Sciences, and the editor-in-chief of Journal of Pharmacy and Pharmaceutical Sciences.

Early life
Fakhreddin was born May 31, 1945 in Arak, Iran to Jamaleddin Jamali and Batoul Rouhani-Jamali.

References

External links
Jamali at the University of Alberta
Canadian Society for Pharmaceutical Sciences 

Living people
Academic staff of the University of Alberta
1945 births
University of Tehran alumni
University of British Columbia alumni
Iranian pharmacists
Canadian pharmacists
Academic journal editors
People from Arak, Iran